Anindya Chatterjee is an Indian bengali film director, music director, singer, lyricist, actor and producer based in Kolkata, West Bengal, India. He is the singer-lyricist of prominent Bengali band Chandrabindoo. In recent times he has composed multifarious songs in Bengali mainstream films as an independent music director.

Education
He is an alumnus of the Scottish Church Collegiate School. He earned an undergraduate degree from the Scottish Church College at the University of Calcutta. As a student at Scottish in the late 1980s, he was invited to perform at the college's annual fest Caledonia, following which he performed his composition Sweetheart. After the success of this song, he became initiated in the Kolkata college festival circuit. In 1989, the band Chandrabindoo was formed, by him along with his college mates Rajesh Bose, Upal Sengupta and Chandril Bhattacharya.

Films

As director

As actor

As lyricist

References 

Scottish Church Collegiate School alumni
Scottish Church College alumni
University of Calcutta alumni
Bengali male poets
Bengali musicians
Living people
Best Lyrics National Film Award winners
Year of birth missing (living people)
Singers from Kolkata
Film directors from Kolkata